Women's suffrage in Australia was one of the early achievements of Australian democracy. Following the progressive establishment of male suffrage in the Australian colonies from the 1840s to the 1890s, an organised push for women's enfranchisement gathered momentum from the 1880s, and began to be legislated from the 1890s, decades in advance of Europe and North America. South Australian women achieved the right to vote in 1894, and to stand for office in 1895 following the world first Constitutional Amendment (Adult Suffrage) Act 1894. This preceded even male suffrage in Tasmania. Western Australia granted women the right to vote from 1899, although with some racial restrictions. In 1902, the newly established Australian Parliament passed the Commonwealth Franchise Act 1902, which set a uniform law enabling women to vote at federal elections and to stand for the federal parliament (although up until 1962, "aboriginal natives" could be excluded from voting rights based on state legislation). By 1908, the remaining Australian states had legislated for women's suffrage for state elections. Grace Benny was elected as the first councillor in 1919, Edith Cowan the first state Parliamentarian in 1921, Dorothy Tangney the first Senator and Enid Lyons the first Member of the House of Representatives in 1943.

History

Pitcairn and Norfolk Islands
The female descendants of the Bounty mutineers who lived on Pitcairn Islands could vote from 1838, and this right transferred with their resettlement to Norfolk Island (now an Australian external territory) in 1856.

Male Suffrage
The first European-style governments established after 1788 were autocratic and run by appointed governors – although English law was transplanted into the Australian colonies by virtue of the doctrine of reception, thus notions of the rights and processes established by the Magna Carta and the Bill of Rights 1689 were brought from Britain by the colonists. Agitation for representative government began soon after the settlement of the colonies.

The oldest legislative body in Australia, the New South Wales Legislative Council, was created in 1825 as an appointed body to advise the Governor of New South Wales. In 1840 the Adelaide City Council and the Sydney City Council were established with limited male suffrage. Australia's first parliamentary elections were conducted for the New South Wales Legislative Council in 1843, again with voting rights (for males only) tied to property ownership or financial capacity. Voter rights were extended further in New South Wales in 1850 and elections for legislative councils were held in the colonies of Victoria, South Australia, and Tasmania.

By the mid-19th  century, there was a strong desire for representative and responsible government in the colonies of Australia, fed by the democratic spirit of the goldfields evident at the Eureka Stockade and the ideas of the great reform movements sweeping Europe, the United States and the British Empire, such as Chartism. The Australian Colonies Government Act, passed in 1850, was a landmark development that granted representative constitutions to New South Wales, Victoria, South Australia, and Tasmania and the colonies enthusiastically set about writing constitutions which produced democratically progressive parliaments – through the constitutions generally maintained the role of the colonial upper houses as representative of social and economic "interests" and all established Constitutional Monarchies with the British monarch as the symbolic head of state. 1855 also saw the granting of the right to vote to all male British subjects 21 years or over in South Australia. This right was extended to Victoria in 1857 and New South Wales the following year. The other colonies followed until, in 1896, Tasmania became the last colony to grant universal male suffrage.

Women's suffrage movement

A movement for women's suffrage gathered pace during the 19th century. The experience and organizations involved in the suffrage movement varied across the colonies.

Propertied women in the colony of South Australia were granted the vote in local elections (but not parliamentary elections) in 1861. The Parliament of South Australia endorsed the right to vote and stand for parliament in 1894 and the law received royal assent in 1895. The law applied equally in the Northern Territory, which was then a part of South Australia. Whilst the law was being debated, opponents amended the bill so upon passage, women would allowed to be elected in parliament, expecting such inclusion would scupper the whole bill. Instead, legislators passed the Constitution (Female Suffrage) Bill anyway, so South Australia quite accidentally gave women the right to hold legislative office when it granted them the right to vote. This was because Section 41 of the Australian Constitution holds that "no adult person who has or acquires a right to vote at elections for the more numerous House of the Parliament of a State shall, while the right continues, be prevented by any law of the Commonwealth from voting at elections for either House of the Parliament of the Commonwealth". In 1897, Catherine Helen Spence became the first female political candidate for political office, unsuccessfully standing for election in South Australia as a delegate to Federal Convention on Australian Federation, which was held in Adelaide. However the first woman would not be elected to the South Australia Council or Assembly until 1959. The first women candidates for the South Australia Assembly ran in 1918 general election, in Adelaide and Sturt.

Western Australia granted voting rights to women in 1899, in time for women in the colony state voting in the first federal election.

In Victoria, one of the first known women to vote was London-born businesswoman Mrs Fanny Finch, on 22 January 1856 in the gold rush town of Castlemaine.   The first group of women are included in Helen Harris's “The Right to stand, the right to vote”. The Electoral Act 1863 enfranchised all ratepayers listed on local municipal rolls. Some women ratepayers in Victoria were able to vote at the 1864 colony election. However, the all-male legislature regarded this as a legislative mistake and promptly modified the Act in 1865, in time for the 1866 election, to apply the vote only to male ratepayers. Henrietta Dugdale, who publicly advocated women's suffrage since 1868, and Annie Lowe formed the Victorian Women's Suffrage Society in 1884, the first Australian women's suffrage society. The Society called for votes for women on the same basis as men. It took 19 private members' bills from 1889 before Victorian women gained the vote in 1908, and were able to exercise the vote for the first time at the 1911 state election, the last state to do so. The Victorian Society disbanded in 1908, after women in the state gained the vote.

In 1889, Rose Scott and Mary Windeyer helped to found the Women's Literary Society in Sydney, which grew into the Womanhood Suffrage League of New South Wales in 1891. Women from the Woman's Christian Temperance Union in New South Wales were also active in suffrage activities. They founded the Franchise League in 1890. Eliza Pottie served as president before the league's disbanding. She later joined the Womanhood Suffrage League.

In Queensland, the Women's Equal Franchise Association was formed in 1894, which collected two petitions in 1894 for women's suffrage. The first petition received 7,781 signatures by women and the second received 3,575 signatures by men. The petitions called for one vote and one vote only, as at that time men with property had plural votes.

A third petition was organized by the Woman's Christian Temperance Movement of Queensland in 1897 and attracted 3,869 signatures by men and women, and called for votes for women on the same basis as men. The Franchise Association disbanded in 1905 after women in the state gained the vote.

The Womanhood Suffrage League of New South Wales submitted a petition to the Australasian Federal Convention on 23 March 1897 calling for the right of women to vote in New South Wales, Tasmania, Victoria and Western Australia to be enshrined in the constitution.

A unified body, the Australian Women's Suffrage Society was formed in 1889, with the aim of educating women and men about a woman's right to vote and stand for parliament. Key figures in the Australian suffrage movement included: from South Australia Mary Lee and Catherine Helen Spence; in Western Australia Edith Cowan; from New South Wales Maybanke Anderson, Louisa Lawson, Dora Montefiore and Rose Scott; from Tasmania Alicia O'Shea Petersen and Jessie Rooke; from Queensland Emma Miller; and from Victoria Annette Bear-Crawford, Henrietta Dugdale, Vida Goldstein, Alice Henry, Annie Lowe and Mary Colton.

In 1903, the Women's Political Association was formed.

The various suffrage societies collected signatures for monster suffrage petitions to be tabled in Parliament. The results varied. Recently some of these petitions have been transcribed and can be searched digitally.

Towards voting rights 
The first election for the Parliament of the newly formed Commonwealth of Australia in 1901 was based on the electoral laws of the six federating colonies, so that women who had the vote and the right to stand for Parliament at a colony (now state) level (i.e., in South Australia including the Northern Territory and Western Australia) had the same rights for the 1901 Australian federal election. In 1902, the Commonwealth Parliament passed the uniform Commonwealth Franchise Act 1902, which enabled women 21 years of age and older to vote at elections for the federal Parliament. The States soon gave women over 21 the vote: New South Wales in 1902, Tasmania in 1903, Queensland in 1905, and Victoria in 1908.

However, this franchise was excluded from women (and men) who were "aboriginal natives" of Australia, Africa, Asia, and the Pacific Islands, unless excepted under section 41 of the constitution. Most did not get the vote for federal elections until 1962, and in all States until 1967. This exclusion did not apply to Māori New Zealander women and men.

Summary

See also

Centenary of Women's Suffrage Gazebo
Feminism in Australia
History of Australia
Human rights in Australia
List of suffragists and suffragettes
List of women's rights activists
Politics of Australia
Suffrage in Australia
Timeline of women's suffrage
Voting rights of Indigenous Australians
Women and government in Australia
Women's history#Australia and New Zealand

Notes

Further reading
 Dixson, Miriam. The Real Matilda: Woman and Identity in Australia, 1788 to the Present (UNSW Press, 1999).
 Grieve, Norma, ed. Australian women: Feminist perspectives (Oxford University Press, 1981).
 Grimshaw, Patricia. "Settler anxieties, indigenous peoples, and women's suffrage in the colonies of Australia, New Zealand, and Hawai'i, 1888 to 1902." Pacific Historical Review 69.4 (2000): 553–572. online
 Grimshaw, Patricia, and Katherine Ellinghaus. "White women, Aboriginal women and the vote in Western Australia" in  Women and Citizenship: Suffrage Centenary edited by Patricia Crawford, and Judy Skene.
 Lovenduski, Joni, and Jill Hills, eds. The Politics of the Second Electorate: Women and Public Participation: Britain, USA, Canada, Australia, France, Spain, West Germany, Italy, Sweden, Finland, Eastern Europe, USSR, Japan (Routledge, 2018).
 
 McGrath, Ann, and Winona Stevenson. "Gender, race, and policy: Aboriginal women and the state in Canada and Australia." Labour/Le Travail (1996): 37–53. online
 Oldfield, Audrey. Woman suffrage in Australia : a gift or a struggle? (1992) online
 Sawer, Marian, and Jill Vickers. "Women's constitutional activism in Australia and Canada." Canadian Journal of Women and Law 13 (2001): 1+.
 Tarrant, Stella. "The Woman Suffrage Movements in the United States and Australia: Concepts of Suffrage, Citizenship and Race." Adelaide Law Review 18 (1996): 47+. online

External links
Utopia Girls – How Women won the Vote. Website for ABC TV production about women's suffrage

 
Women's rights in Australia